Cora-Allan Lafaiki Twiss (nee Wickliffe) (born  is a multidisciplinary Aotearoa (New Zealand)-based artist and full time self taught hiapo (Niuean barkcloth) practitioner, Twiss was awarded the Arts Pasifika Award 'Pacific Heritage Artist award' in 2020 through Creative New Zealand.

Biography 
Twiss is Niuean and Māori, with roots in Alofi and Liku, as well as Ngāpuhi and Tainui in Aotearoa. Originally from West Auckland, she was born in 1986. Cora-Allan completed a Bachelor of Visual Art and Design (photography) in 2007 and completed her Masters in Visual Art and Design (performance) from Auckland University of Technology in 2013. Twiss is a founding member of the BC Collective (Before Cook), along with her husband Daniel Twiss. Cora-Allan is renowned in New Zealand and Niue as the only living traditional hiapo (Niuean barkcloth) maker, recognised for resurrecting a dormant art genre. Compiling research for her Masters from AUT Twiss was awarded the Postgraduate Research Award in 2014. Dedicated to hiapo, Twiss distinguishes hiapo (Niuean barkcloth), by imagery/motifs of 'botanical forms alone', differentiating hiapo from tapa and other barkcloth forms in the Pacific. Publishing Hiapo on 25 September 2020 Wickliffe's analysis on hiapo resulted in a book that is accessible and helps recognise hiapo as 'an art form that can be passed on to new generations.' 

Cora-Allan is currently represented by Bartley and Company who is a dealer gallery in Wellington, NZ and is one of few if not the only female artists of Maori and Niuean heritage with representation. Her works are held in major collections such as Te Papa, Auckland War Memorial Museum, Lincoln University (New Zealand), Wallace Art Collection, and Royal Academy of Arts.

She has exhibited globally including, Canada, Australia, England, Niue and New Zealand.

Selected curations 
2020– Moana Legacy. Tautai Contemporary Pacific Arts Trust. Auckland.

Selected exhibitions

Residencies 
2018- Indigenous arts residency, Banff Arts Centre

2021– Te Whare Hera Residency, Massey University and Mana Moana project.
 
2021– McCahon House Residency. Auckland. Histoires on Hiapo installation at Bartley & Company Art Gallery. 10 March - 2 April 2022 Wickliffe during the McCahon House Artist Residency.

Awards 
2004– RSA Community Award.  

2004–2008 Keir Trust Scholarship Award. 

2014– AUT School of Art and Design Postgraduate Research Award.  

2017– Selected finalist for the Estuary Art Awards.  

2019– Selected finalist Molly Morpeth Canaday Award.

2020 – Creative New Zealand Pacific Heritage Artist award – Arts Pasifika Awards

2021- Selected finalist National Contemporary Art Award Waikato Museum 

2021- Selected finalist Parkin Prize Award, Wellington 

2021– Springboard Award, Arts Foundation of New Zealand (award includes mentorship from 2008 Arts Foundation Laureate Shane Cotton)

2022– Selected finalist Molly Morpeth Canaday Award.

References

External links 
 Wickliffe's Hiapo (Niuean barkcloth)
 Wickliffe's Hiapo (Niuean barkcloth)
 Wckliffe's tapa inspired garments

1980s births
Living people
Niuean artists
New Zealand artists
Artists from Auckland
Auckland University of Technology alumni